Ambrosiodmus rubricollis is a species of typical bark beetle in the family Curculionidae. It is found in North America and has been introduced to Italy.

References

Further reading

 
 

Scolytinae
Beetles described in 1875
Beetles of North America
Articles created by Qbugbot